James Harrop (January 1884 – 25 May 1954) was an English footballer.

Life and playing career
Born in Eccleshall, Yorkshire. January 1884. Christened Jem but always known as Jimmy. His parents were George and Maria Harrop. His father was a Grinder and he followed his father into that trade until earning enough from his football.

He married Clara Sweetman in April 1919 when he was 24. They had two daughters, Alice and Lily.

He died on 25 May 1954, in Edale Derbyshire, aged 70

Harrop played for Sheffield Wednesday, Denaby United and Rotherham Town (who merged with Rotherham County in 1919 to form Rotherham United) before being signed by Liverpool manager Tom Watson in 1907. Making his Liverpool debut in a Football League Division One match on 18 January 1908, he scored his first goal 18 months later on 27 March 1909. Harrop, a central defender, only made 8 appearances in his first season but went on to play 139 matches for the Anfield club during his 5 seasons, scoring 4 times.

Harrop left the Reds at the end of the 1912 season and joined Aston Villa. He finished his career at Sheffield United.

References

External links
Profile at LFCHistory.net

1884 births
1958 deaths
Footballers from Sheffield
Association football defenders
English footballers
Sheffield Wednesday F.C. players
Denaby United F.C. players
Rotherham Town F.C. (1899) players
Liverpool F.C. players
Aston Villa F.C. players
Sheffield United F.C. players
Burton Town F.C. players
English Football League players
English Football League representative players
People from Ecclesall
FA Cup Final players